Léon Joseph Semmeling (Moelingen (Mouland), 4 January 1940) is a retired Belgian footballer.

During his career he played for R. Standard de Liège. He earned 35 caps for the Belgium national football team, and participated in the 1970 FIFA World Cup and UEFA Euro 1972.

Honours

Player 
Standard Liege

 Belgian First Division: 1960–61, 1962–63, 1968–69, 1969–70, 1970–71
 Belgian Cup: 1965–66, 1966–67
 Jules Pappaert Cup: 1971

International

Belgium 

 UEFA Euro 1972: Third place

References

Profile at Standard de Liège

1940 births
Living people
Footballers from Limburg (Belgium)
Belgian footballers
Belgium international footballers
1970 FIFA World Cup players
UEFA Euro 1972 players
Standard Liège players
Belgian football managers
Standard Liège managers
Belgian Pro League players
Association football midfielders